Monroe County is a county in the Finger Lakes region of the State of New York. The county is along Lake Ontario's southern shore. At the 2020 census, Monroe County's population was 759,443, an increase since the 2010 census. Its county seat and largest city is the city of Rochester. The county is named after James Monroe, the fifth president of the United States. Monroe County is part of the Rochester, NY Metropolitan Statistical Area.

History
When counties were established in the Province of New York in 1683, the present Monroe County was part of Albany County. This was an enormous county, including the northern part of the State of New York as well as all of the present State of Vermont and, in theory, extending westward to the Pacific Ocean. This county was reduced in size on July 3, 1766, by the creation of Cumberland County, and further on March 16, 1770, by the creation of Gloucester County, both containing territory now in Vermont.

On March 12, 1772, what was left of Albany County was split into three parts, one remaining under the name Albany County. One of the other pieces, Tryon County, contained the western portion (and thus, since no western boundary was specified, theoretically still extended west to the Pacific). The eastern boundary of Tryon County was approximately five miles west of the present city of Schenectady, and the county included the western part of the Adirondack Mountains and the area west of the West Branch of the Delaware River. The area then designated as Tryon County now includes 37 counties of the State of New York. The county was named for William Tryon, colonial governor of New York.

In the years prior to 1776, most of the Loyalists in Tryon County fled to Canada. In 1784, following the peace treaty that ended the American Revolutionary War, the name of Tryon County was changed to Montgomery County in order to honor the general, Richard Montgomery, who had captured several places in Canada and died attempting to capture the city of Quebec, replacing the name of the hated British governor.

In 1789, Ontario County was split off from Montgomery. The actual area split off from Montgomery County was much larger than the present county, also including the present Allegany, Cattaraugus, Chautauqua, Erie, Genesee, Livingston, Monroe, Niagara, Orleans, Steuben, Wyoming, Yates, and part of Schuyler and Wayne counties.

Genesee County was created by a splitting of Ontario County in 1802. This was much larger than the present Genesee County, however. It contained the present Allegany, Cattaraugus, Chautauqua, Erie, Niagara, Orleans, Wyoming, and portions of Livingston and Monroe counties.

Finally, Monroe County was formed from parts of Genesee and Ontario counties in 1821.

Geography

Monroe County is in Western State of New York's northern tier, northeast of Buffalo and northwest of Syracuse.  The northern county line is also the state line and the border of the United States, marked by Lake Ontario.  Monroe County is north of the Finger Lakes.

Adjacent counties
 Wayne County - east
 Ontario County - southeast
 Livingston County - south
 Orleans County - west
 Genesee County - southwest

Major highways

 
 
 
 
  New York State Route 15
  New York State Route 15A
  New York State Route 18
  New York State Route 19
  New York State Route 31
  New York State Route 31F
  New York State Route 33
  New York State Route 33A
  New York State Route 36
  New York State Route 64
  New York State Route 65
  New York State Route 96
  New York State Route 104
  New York State Route 153
  New York State Route 250
  New York State Route 251
  New York State Route 252
  New York State Route 259
  New York State Route 286
  New York State Route 390
  New York State Route 404
  New York State Route 441
  New York State Route 531
  New York State Route 590
  Lake Ontario State Parkway

Government and politics
From 1856 to 1932, Monroe County voted for the Republican candidate in every presidential election apart from 1912. Democratic candidate Woodrow Wilson was able to win the county in 1912 when the Republican vote was divided between then incumbent president William Howard Taft and former president Theodore Roosevelt. Monroe County voted for incumbent Democratic presidents Franklin D. Roosevelt (1936, 1940, 1944) and Harry S. Truman (1948). From 1952 to 1976, Monroe County voted for the Republican candidate in all presidential elections except for Lyndon B. Johnson's Democratic landslide in 1964. In 1980, incumbent Democratic president Jimmy Carter won Monroe County, despite having lost in the county to Republican Gerald Ford in 1976. Monroe County went back Republican in 1984 and 1988, but has voted for the Democratic presidential candidate every time from 1992 onwards, up to and including the 2020 election.

|}

County government
Monroe County was chartered as a municipal corporation by the New York State Legislature in 1892 and re-chartered under New York's Municipal Home Rule Law in 1965.

Executive branch
The county's executive branch is headed by the County Executive, Adam Bello. The executive's office is on the first floor of the County Office Building on West Main Street in Rochester. The County Clerk is Jamie Romeo.
 
The county was exclusively governed by a Board of Supervisors for the first 114 years of its history. In 1935, the position of County Manager, appointed by the Board, was approved by popular referendum.  In 1983, the position was replaced by a County Executive, directly elected by popular vote, with expanded powers (e.g., veto).  In 1993, the legislature enacted term limits for the executive office of 12 consecutive years to start in 1996.

Sheriff

The Monroe County Sheriff's Office (MCSO) provides law enforcement and has the constitutional authority is to operate the county jail and provide civil functions. As with most counties in New York, the MCSO also performs a range of police services and provides physical and operational security to the courts. The MCSO is led by a Sheriff who is elected by the residents of Monroe County, serving a 4-year term. They are considered the highest police official in the county, followed by an appointed Undersheriff and subordinate Chief Deputy. As of March 2022, Todd K. Baxter is the Monroe County Sheriff.

Organizationally, the office is composed of numerous bureaus, each responsible for a given scope of functional operations. The Jail Bureau is the largest component of the Sheriff's Office, overseeing an inmate population of around 1,000. Under the New York State Constitution, the Sheriff is the warden of the county jail.

The Police Bureau of the Sheriff's Office operates a sizable road patrol force which serves municipalities within Monroe County that do not independently enforce traffic. They are also responsible for primary police patrols at the Greater Rochester International Airport and parks throughout the county. Deputies assigned to the Marine Unit patrol the coastline of Lake Ontario as well as Irondequoit Bay. The Police Bureau further employs a mounted unit, bomb squad, SWAT team, hostage recovery, criminal investigations, SCUBA, and canine units. The court security bureau provides security at the Hall of Justice as well as at the state Appellate Court building.

In 2011, the Monroe County Sheriff's Office's uniform was named the 2011 Public Safety Uniform Award in the County Sheriff's/Police Department category by the North American Association of Uniform Manufacturers and Distributors (NAUMD).

Legislative branch
The county's legislative branch consists of a 29-member County Legislature which replaced the earlier 43-member Board of Supervisors on January 1, 1967.  It meets in the Legislative Chambers on the fourth floor of the County Office Building. All 29 members of the Legislature are elected from districts. There are currently 15 Democrats and 14 Republicans. The President of the Legislature is Sabrina LaMar, a Democrat who cacuses with the Republicans giving the Republicans the majority. In 1993, the Legislature enacted term limits of 10 consecutive years to start in 1996. Legislators can return to the office after not being in the Legislature for a term. Since the enacting of term limits, as of 2022 four Legislators (Stephanie Aldersley, Karla Boyce, Calvin Lee, Jr., and Robert Colby) returned after previously being term limited; Boyce was re-elected again three times while Lee and Colby were appointed to fill vacancies before subsequently being re-elected themselves and Aldersley was appointed before being defeated for re-election.

Judicial branch
 Monroe County Court
 Monroe County Family Court, for matters involving children
 Monroe County Surrogates Court, for matters involving the deceased

Representation at the federal level
After redistricting based on the 2020 United States Census, New York’s 27th District was eliminated and Monroe County went from being split between two congressional districts to being wholly contained in one:

Representation at the state level

New York State Senate
After redistricting based on the 2020 United States Census, Monroe County was split between four state senate districts:

New York State Assembly
After redistricting based on the 2020 United States Census, Monroe County was split between eight state assembly districts:

Courts
Monroe County is part of
 The 7th Judicial District of the New York Supreme Court.
 The 4th Division of the New York Supreme Court, Appellate Division

Economy
Monroe County is a home to a number of international businesses, including Eastman Kodak, Paychex, and Pictometry International, all of which make Monroe County their world headquarters. While no longer headquartered in Rochester, Xerox has its principal offices and manufacturing facilities in Monroe County (Xerox 2010 Annual Report), and Bausch and Lomb was headquartered in Rochester until it was acquired by Valeant Pharmaceuticals. Monroe County is also home to regional businesses such as Wegmans, Roberts Communications, Inc., Holding Corp., and major fashion label Hickey Freeman.

High technology

Tech Valley, the technologically recognized area of eastern New York State, has spawned a western offshoot into the Rochester, Monroe County, and Finger Lakes areas of New York State. Since the 2000s, as the more established companies in Rochester downsized, the economy of Rochester and Monroe County has been redirected toward high technology, with new, smaller companies providing the seed capital necessary for business foundation. The Rochester and Monroe County area is important in the field of photographic processing and imaging as well as incubating an increasingly diverse high technology sphere encompassing STEM fields, in part the result of private startup enterprises collaborating with major academic institutions, including the University of Rochester and Cornell University. Given the high prevalence of imaging and optical science among the industry and the universities, Rochester is known as the world capital of imaging. The Institute of Optics of the University of Rochester and the Rochester Institute of Technology in nearby Henrietta both have imaging programs.

Major Employers:

Several industries occupy a major portion of the jobs located regionally, with healthcare comprising a significant portion of jobs in Monroe County.  The U of R (including its numerous hospitals) is the largest employer regionally with over 27,000 workers; Rochester Regional Health (parent company of Rochester General and Unity Hospitals) is the second largest consisting of over 15,000.  Wegmans is third with about 13,000 local employees.

Demographics

As of the census of 2020, there were 759,443 people, 301,948
households, and 232,500 families residing in the county. The population density was 1,155 people per square mile (446/km2). There were 330,247 housing units at an average density of 502 per square mile (194/km2). The county's racial makeup was 68.6% White, 15.7% African American, 0.3% Native American, 4.3% Asian, 0.01% Pacific Islander, 4.0% from other races, and 7.1% from two or more races. Hispanic or Latino of any race were 9.6% of the population. 18.6% were of Italian, 15.3% German, 11.3% Irish and 8.3% English ancestry according to Census 2000. In 2007, 4.64% of the population reported speaking Spanish at home, while 1.43% speak Italian.

There were 301,948 households, out of which 54% were married couples living together, 18% had a female householder with no husband present, 6% had a male householder with no wife present, and 23% were non-families. The average household size was 2.37.

In the county, the population was spread out, with 21% being 18 or younger, 15% from 19 to 29, 13% from 30 to 39, 11% from 40 to 49, 14% from 50 to 59, 12% from 60 to 69, and 13% who were 70 years of age or older. The median age was 39 years. 52% of the population was Female, and 48% was Male

The median income for a household in the county was $62,103. The per capita income for the county was $35,797. About 12.7% of the population were below the poverty line, including 19.0% of those under age 18 and 8.0% of those age 65 or over. 90.4% of those 25 years or over was a High school graduate or higher, and 38.6% of those 25 years or over had a Bachelor’s degree or higher.

2020 Census

Education

Primary and secondary education
The public school systems educates the overwhelming majority of Monroe County's children. The schools operated by the Roman Catholic Diocese of Rochester or Roman Catholic religious orders educate the next largest segment of children, although collectively, they are a distant second.

Public schools
There are some 25 public school districts that serve Monroe County, including the Rochester City School District, 10 suburban school districts in Monroe #1 BOCES, seven in Monroe #2–Orleans BOCES, and several primarily serving other counties (Avon, Byron–Bergen, Caledonia–Mumford, Holley, Wayne, Williamson and Victor central school districts).

Private schools
There are three private schools that serve more than 200 students each:
 Allendale Columbia School, a college preparatory school in Pittsford
 The Harley School, a college preparatory school in Brighton
 Mary Cariola Children's Center serving children with multiple, complex disabilities in the city

There is one small, but historically significant school: Rochester School for the Deaf in the city

Parochial schools
 There are three small Judaic schools and two small Islamic schools.
 There are about ten primary schools operated by the Roman Catholic Diocese of Rochester.
 There are four senior high schools (or combined junior/senior high schools) operated by or in the tradition of a Roman Catholic religious order:
{| class="wikitable sortable"
|-
! School !! Founding religious order !! Location !! Established !! Grades
|-
| Aquinas Institute || Basilian || City of Rochester || 1902 || 6–12
|-
| Bishop Kearney High School || Christian Brothers, Sisters of Notre Dame || Irondequoit || 1962 || 6–12
|-
| McQuaid Jesuit High School || Jesuits || Brighton || 1954 || 6–12
|-
| Our Lady of Mercy School for Young Women || Sisters of Mercy || Brighton || 1928 || 6–12
|}
 There are more than two dozen schools operated by various sects of Christianity, two of which serve more than 200 students:
{| class="wikitable sortable"
|-
! School !! Religious affiliation !! Location !! Established !! Grades
|-
| The Charles Finney School || Non-denominational Christian || Penfield || 1992 || K–12
|-
| Northstar Christian Academy || Baptist || Gates || 1972 || K–12
|}

Colleges and universities

The county is home to nine colleges and universities:
 Bryant & Stratton College in Greece and Henrietta
 Colgate Rochester Crozer Divinity School in the city
 Monroe Community College in Brighton with a campus in the city
 Nazareth College in Pittsford
 Roberts Wesleyan College in Chili
 Rochester Institute of Technology in Henrietta
 St. Bernard's School of Theology and Ministry in Pittsford
 St. John Fisher University in Pittsford
 State University of New York at Brockport in Brockport with a campus in the city
 University of Rochester in the city
Additionally, four colleges maintain satellite campuses in Monroe County:
 The Cornell University School of Industrial and Labor Relations maintains an office in the city
 Empire State College maintains the Genesee Valley Learning Center in Irondequoit
 Ithaca College's Department of Physical Therapy leases part of the Colgate Rochester Crozer Divinity School facility for teaching and research
 Medaille College maintains its Rochester Campus in Brighton

Parks

County parks 

The following is a list of parks owned and maintained by Monroe County: 

 Abraham Lincoln Park
 Black Creek Park
 Churchville Park
 Devil's Cove Park
 Durand Eastman Park
 Ellison Park
 Genesee Valley Park
 Greece Canal Park
 Highland Park
 Irondequoit Bay Park West
 Lehigh Valley Trail Park
 Lucian Morin Park
 Mendon Ponds Park
 Northampton Park
 Oatka Creek Park
 Ontario Beach Park
 Powder Mills Park
 Seneca Park
 Seneca Park Zoo
 Tryon Park
 Webster Park

State parks 
The following is a list of parks owned and maintained by New York State:
 Hamlin Beach State Park
 Irondequoit Bay State Marine Park

Communities

Larger settlements

Towns

 Brighton
 Chili
 Clarkson
 East Rochester
 Gates
 Greece
 Hamlin
 Henrietta
 Irondequoit
 Mendon
 Ogden
 Parma
 Penfield
 Perinton
 Pittsford
 Riga
 Rush
 Sweden
 Webster
 Wheatland

Hamlets
In New York State the term "Hamlet", although not defined in law, is used to describe an unincorporated community and geographic location within a town.  The town in which each Hamlet is located is in parenthesis.

 Genesee Junction (Chili)
 Egypt (Perinton)
 Adams Basin (Ogden)
 Bushnell's Basin (Perinton)
 Gates Center (Gates)
 Garbutt (Scottsville)
 Mumford (Wheatland)
 Union Hill (Webster)
 Mendon Center (Mendon)
 Seabreeze (Irondequoit)
 Summerville (Irondequoit)
 Parma Center (Parma)
 Riga Center (Riga)
 Sweden Center (Sweden)
 West Webster (Webster)
 North Chili (Chili)
 Clarkson Corners (Clarkson)
 Clifton (Chili)
 Industry (Rush)
 Belcoda (Wheatland)
 Coldwater (Gates)
 Barnard (Greece)
 Beattie Beach (Greece)
 Braddock Bay (Greece)
 Braddock Heights (Greece)
 Elmgrove (Greece)
 Grandview Heights (Greece)
 Grand View Beach (Greece)
 North Greece (Greece)
 Ridgemont (Greece)
 West Greece (Greece)

See also

 List of people from Rochester, New York
 Monroe County, New York Sheriff's Office
 National Register of Historic Places listings in Monroe County, New York

Notes

References

Further reading
 
 
 Sherwood, D.A. (2003). Water resources of Monroe County, New York, water years 1997-99, with emphasis on water quality in the Irondequoit Creek basin : atmospheric deposition, ground water, streamflow, trends in water quality, and chemical loads to Irondequoit Bay [Water-Resources Investigations Report 02-4221]. Ithaca, NY: U.S. Department of the Interior, U.S. Geological Survey.

External links

 Official webpage
 
 Monroe County Library System
 Rochester Wiki Monroe County Page
 Monroe County Parks Department
 The Roman Catholic Diocese of Rochester, New York

 
1821 establishments in New York (state)
Populated places established in 1821
Rochester metropolitan area, New York